"Musician" is a song by American record producer Porter Robinson. It is the fifth single from Robinson's second album Nurture, released on March 3, 2021.

Background and composition
In 2019, Robinson worked on an unreleased collaboration with British band Kero Kero Bonito. Samples from the demo would later be used in "Musician".

Robinson stated in a tweet that he had a rule for Nurture, which was "no supersaws[,] no 808 subs[,] no classic breakbeats", but he decided to "have fun" with "Musician". In a press release, Robinson stated that "Musician" was one of the very last songs written for Nurture.

Reception 
Pitchforks Colin Joyce said that, on the song, Robinson "mulls the difficulty of making art during tough times, flickering between despair and reassurance", by singing: "I just can't stop, I'm sorry / I can feel a new day dawning." Magnetic Mags Ryan Middleton stated that the "semi autobiographical track" describes "a eureka moment of finding inspiration." Triple J writer Sose Fuamoli said: "It's here where we can hear him turn that corner and find the love in music that had been missing. The music swells and revels in being uplifting, which makes sense - it’s one of the songs closest to Robinson even today." Sebastian Flores Chong of EDMTunes declared that "Musician" is "an amazing song" with unique and distinct elements, while still resembling Porter Robinson's music style. PopMatters writer Chris Conaton describes "Musician" as "full electropop, with a host of synths, samples, and other electronic sounds providing the music", and further describes it as "a joyous-sounding pop track that sounds like a celebration without becoming cloying."

Accolades
"Musician" was ranked at seventy-fourth place on NPR's annual list of best songs and placed on their list of best electronic songs of the year.

Music video
The music video for "Musician" was released on YouTube on March 18, 2021. It was directed by Waboku and Mah and animated by Dokai Asuka, rui, Ono Hokuto, Oyama Aiko, Sakai Hiroshi, Nishimura Fukutaro and Ryoko K. (Shatter). It has anime influences, similarly to "Shelter" and showing Robinson's "love for Japanese culture and the style of anime", according to We Rave Yous Ellie Mullins. The video is about a boy looking to pursue his passion for music at the risk of being outcast from society.

Charts

References

External links
 

2021 singles
2021 songs
Porter Robinson songs
Mom + Pop Music singles
Song recordings produced by Porter Robinson
Songs written by Porter Robinson
Electropop songs